The 2021–22 Cal State Fullerton Titans men's basketball team represented California State University, Fullerton in the 2021–22 NCAA Division I men's basketball season. The Titans, led by ninth-year head coach Dedrique Taylor, played their home games at Titan Gym as members of the Big West Conference. They finished the season 21–11, 11–4 in Big West play to finish in second place. As the No. 2 seed, they defeated UC Davis, Hawaii, and Long Beach State to be champions of the Big West tournament. They received the conference’s automatic bid to the NCAA tournament as the No. 15 seed in the West Region, where they lost in the first round to Duke.

Previous season 

The Titans finished the 2020–21 season 5–6 overall, 4–6 in Big West Conference play to in 7th in the conference standings. The Big West Conference tournament was cancelled due to the COVID-19 pandemic, ending the Titans season.

Roster

Schedule and results 

|-
!colspan=9 style=| Exhibition

|-
!colspan=9 style=| Non-conference regular season

|-
!colspan=9 style=| Big West regular season

|-
!colspan=12 style=| Big West tournament

|-
!colspan=9 style=| NCAA tournament

Source:

References 

Cal State Fullerton Titans men's basketball seasons
Cal State Fullerton
Cal State Fullerton
Cal State Fullerton
Cal State Fullerton